Veit Amerbach (also Vitus Amerpachius) (born in 1503 in Wemding, Germany – died  on September 13, 1557 in Ingolstadt, Germany), was a German Lutheran theologian, scholar and humanist, who converted to Catholicism.

Life

Amerbach was born at Wembdinden in 1503. Up to age of 14 he attended in his hometown Wemding at Weth the Latin School and then went to study at the University of Ingolstadt. On July 7, 1521, he enrolled at the University of Freiburg. In the following year, he moved to the University of Wittenberg, where he met with the reformer Martin Luther and the humanist Philipp Melanchthon that shaped his future. Through the mediation of Luther in 1528 he became a teacher at the Latin school in Eisleben, where he worked with Johannes Agricola of Eisleben. In the University of Wittenberg he continued his philosophical studies and on December 12, 1529 with the acquisition of the Magister found their completion.

In the same year, he married Elisabeth, and the couple had eleven children. From 1530 to 1532, Amerbach was in the Senate of the art department of the University of Wittenberg, and in the winter semester 1538/39 he was Dean of the Faculty of Arts and was after 1529 professor at Pädagogium and from 1535 Professor of Physics. Luther and Gregory Brück sent him in 1541 in the Saxon Consistory of Wittenberg to participate in the sovereign government of the Church. When in-depth study of the church fathers Amerbach came to a different conclusion, so that disagreements arose to Reformation ideas, particularly with regard to the doctrine of justification and of the papal primacy. Then came his 1542 rebuttal to Philip Melanchthon "Commentarius De Anima".

Conversion to Roman Catholicism

After much controversial correspondence with Melancthon, he left Wittenberg in 1543, and was received, with his wife and children, into the Catholic Church. The Prince Bishop Maurice von Hutten made him professor of rhetoric at Eichstätt. A year later, he went to Ingolstadt, as professor of philosophy, where he remained until his death on 13 September 1557. At the University of Ingolstadt, he lectured on Aristotelian philosophy and rhetoric. Soon he enjoyed a widespread reputation as Horace - and Cicero commentator, tried to himself as a poet, but also in Latin. During his many years of teaching in Ingolstadt he was also committed to an equality with the rest of the philosophical faculties.

Veit Amerbach was buried inside the parochial church of Our Lady in Ingolstadt.

Works

Oratio de doctoratu philosophico, in: V. Rotmar, Tome I orationum Ingolstadiensium. Ingolstadt 1571, sheet 351

Three letters Amerbach to Julius Pflug 1548/49, in: Ch G. Müller, P. Epistolae Mosellani etc. ... ad Julium Pflugium ... 1802, page 119-125

Neulat. Poems in: Deliciae Poetarum Germanorum, 4 vols, Frankfurt 1612:
http://www.uni-mannheim.de/mateo/camena/del1/books/deliciae1_7.html

Quatuor Libri de anima, 4 Books, 1542 (rebuttal to Philipp Melanchthon Commentarius De Anima, 1540).

Detailed directory in:

Wetzer and Welte's Church Dictionary or Encyclopedia of Catholic theology and its auxiliary sciences . Second Edition, Volume I, 1882, 709-711 Sp.

Christian Gottlieb Jöcher : General scholarly lexicon . Volume 1, 1750, Sp 341st

Johann Christoph Adelung : Continuation and additions to Christian Gottlieb Jöchers general scholar-Lexico . Volume 1, 1784, Sp 722nd

Literature

Winfried Trusen:  http://bsbndb.bsb.lrz-muenchen.de/sfz814.html In: New German Biography (NDB). Volume 1, Cambridge University Press, London, 1953, p 248 ( digitized ).

German Biographical Encyclopedia (DBE). Volume 1, 1995, page 114

Heinz Scheible: Melanchthon's correspondence persons . Volume 11

Heinz Kathe: The Wittenberg Faculty 1501-1817 . Böhlau, Cologne 2002, 

Frederick William Bautz :  Amerbach, Veit. In: Biographic-bibliographic church encyclopedia (BBKL). Volume 1, Bautz, Hamm 1975, M. 144-145.

Carl Ruland  Amerbach, Veit . In: General German Biography (ADB). Volume 1, Cambridge University Press, Leipzig 1875, p 398th

Helmar Junghans: Directory of rectors, vice-rectors, deans, professors and preachers of the Castle Church Leucorea the summer term 1536 and winter semester 1574/75. in: Irene Dingel and Günther Wartenberg : George Major (1502-1574). A theologian of the Wittenberg Reformation. Protestant publishing house, Leipzig, 2005,

Works
A humanist scholar, he wrote learned works, including:

Commentaria on Cicero and Horace;
Antiparadoxa, with autobiographical content, and
Tres Epistolae, on the ecclesiastical controversies of the period.

References

1503 births
1557 deaths
Converts to Roman Catholicism from Lutheranism
16th-century German Catholic theologians
People from Donau-Ries